Walter Rye (31 October 1843 – 24 February 1929) was a British athlete and antiquary, who wrote over 80 works on Norfolk.

Early life
Walter Rye was born on 31 October 1843 in Chelsea, London. He was the seventh child of Edward Rye, a solicitor and bibliophile, and his wife, Maria Rye née Tuppen. His sister was the social reformer Maria Rye, and his brother was the entomologist Edward Caldwell Rye. His grandfather was Edward Rye of Baconsthorpe, Norfolk.

Career
Rye was the "father" of cross country running (or paper chasing, as it was then known), being the principal founder in 1868 of the Thames Hare and Hounds, and its president until his death. He won over 100 prizes for walking, running and cycling. He also served as the athletics correspondent of the Sporting Gazette.

He regularly visited Norwich throughout his life, and helped save a number of its historic buildings from destruction. He was a founder member of the Norfolk Broads Protection Society. In 1900 he retired from his career as a solicitor and settled in Norwich; and only eight years later was elected Mayor, an office he held in the year 1908–9.

Personal life
Rye married Georgina Eliza Sturges in 1870: he described her as "the prettiest and pluckiest creature I have ever met". The couple had seven sons and three daughters, including the solicitor and conservative politician Frank Rye.

Rye died at his Norwich home, 66 Clarendon Road, on 24 February 1929. He is buried in the village of Lamas, Norfolk.

References

Further reading

External links
 

1843 births
1929 deaths
People from Chelsea, London
Mayors of Norwich
English antiquarians
Historians of Norfolk
Contributors to the Victoria County History
English male cross country runners